The Bay State Breakers were a Tier III junior ice hockey organization in the United States Premier Hockey League (USPHL). The organization played home games at The Bog Ice Arena in Kingston, Massachusetts.

Since 2017, the Breakers is solely a youth hockey organization composed of teams competing in the Eastern Hockey Federation, the USPHL's youth divisions, the EHF Selects, the New England Girls League and the Eastern Minor Hockey League with teams ranging from age 6 through 18. The program is operated within the Rockland Ice Rink although it utilizes a number of other local facilities, such as The Bog Ice Arena, Hobomock Arenas, Quincy Shea, and Bavis Arena.

History
The Bay State Breakers formerly had a team in the USPHL Premier Division. The Premier team was originally a Tier III Junior A team in the Eastern Junior Hockey League (EJHL) where it played from 1999 until the league's dissolution in 2013. The EJHL Breakers qualified for the 2007 USA Hockey Tier III Junior A National Championships for being the runner-up in the 2006–07 season. They would eventually lose in the Championship game to the EJHL Champions, New Hampshire Junior Monarchs.

While in the EJHL, the Breakers' organization also fielded Junior B teams in the Empire Junior Hockey League (EmJHL) and the Eastern States Hockey League (ESHL) which joined the USPHL in the Empire and Elite Divisions, respectively. In 2015, the Premier team was sold to the ownership of the Syracuse Stars organization. The Breakers would also drop their Empire Division team and only fielded one Tier III team in the USPHL Elite Division.

After the 2016–17 season, the organization focused solely on youth programs instead of junior programs.

Season-by-season records

References

External links
 Official Site

1997 establishments in Massachusetts
Ice hockey clubs established in 1997
Ice hockey teams in Massachusetts
Rockland, Massachusetts
Sports in Plymouth County, Massachusetts